Clubman may refer to:
Clubman (racing car class)
BL Mini Clubman, a small car produced by British Leyland from 1969 to 1980
British Rail Class 168 Clubman, a diesel multiple-unit train
Clubman TT, a motorcycle sport event in the Isle of Man from 1947 to 1956
Elfin Clubman and Elfin Type 5 Clubman, sports cars produced by Elfin Sports Cars
Elfin MS8 Clubman, a sports car produced by Elfin Sports Cars from 2006
Mini Clubman (2007), a small car produced by BMW under the Mini brand from 2007
Morris Mini Clubman, the Australian version of the BL Mini Clubman